Sierra de Bequeville is a mountain range in Argentina. It is formed by two ridges, one mostly formed by Ordovician flysch and the other by rocks of uncertain age.

Cinder cones along the Bequeville fault which runs in the range have erupted lava flows of basaltic andesite composition which are similar to other Puna volcanic rocks. This fault originally was probably a thrust fault; later strike-slip faulting induced the onset of crustal extension which localizes the volcanic vents.

References 
 

Mountains of Argentina